Glenelg was an electoral district of the House of Assembly in the Australian state of South Australia from 1938 to 1985.

The Holdfast Bay area has long been a conservative stronghold, and Glenelg was one of the few Adelaide-area seats where the Liberal and Country League consistently did well. The pattern was broken at the 1965 state election, when Glenelg was one of two Labor gains that helped Labor finally beat the Playmander and end 33 years of LCL rule. Labor retained the seat even as it lost government in 1968. The LCL regained it in 1970 even as Labor won a convincing victory in the first election held after a major electoral reform gave Adelaide a majority of seats in the legislature. The seat quickly reverted to its traditional status as a safely conservative seat.

Glenelg was abolished in a boundary redistribution prior to the 1985 election with much of the area merged into the seat of Morphett.

Members

Election results

References 

Former electoral districts of South Australia
1938 establishments in Australia
1985 disestablishments in Australia